Rixon is a village near Sturminster Newton in Dorset, England.

The village's transport links are currently provided by Damory Coaches, services 369 between Blandford Forum and Yeovil, and 309 between Blandford Forum and Shaftesbury.

Etymology
The name Rixon was derived from the Old English word risc, "rushes", and survives as Rix and Rex in the dialects of Dorset, Somerset and Devon.

References

Villages in Dorset